Lane Napper (born June 22, 1967) is an American actor, choreographer, dancer, acting coach, and dancing teacher.

Filmography

As actor
Lane Napper participated acting in some television shows and series.

As choreographer 
Napper is a professional choreographer, participating in some television series.

As dialogue coach
Napper participated as dialogue coach in some Nickelodeon television series.

Personal life 
Lane Napper has his personal acting school called "Camp PULSE Acting Workshop with Lane Napper" where he teaches the new talent to act like their favorite television stars, also he gives the students dancing lessons at his school.

Napper is the choreographer of the American K-pop band EXP during their musical tour.

He also gives dancing lessons at the Broadway Dance Center.

References

External links

1967 births
Living people
20th-century American male actors
21st-century American male actors
African-American choreographers
African-American male actors
African-American male dancers
American acting coaches
American choreographers
American male dancers
American male film actors
American male television actors
20th-century African-American people
21st-century African-American people